Dibi may refer to:

People
 Jamal Dibi (born 1979), Dutch football player
 Souad Dibi, Moroccan activist
 Tofik Dibi (born 1980), Dutch politician

Places
 Boundiali Airport, by ICAO code

Other
 Dibi (food)